Kavin Raj is an Indian actor, who has appeared in Tamil language films and television serials. He is best known for essaying the lead role in the popular Saravanan Meenatchi serial. He then went on to star in the movie Natpuna Ennanu Theriyuma as Shiva. In 2019, Kavin became a household name after his popular stint on  Bigg Boss (Season 3) as a contestant

Career 
While completing his education at Loyola College, Kavin attended auditions with Star Vijay. His first appearance in television serials was through the college version of Kana Kaanum Kaalangal, where he appeared as a student. He continued working on Star Vijay, appearing in supporting roles in the serials Thayumanavan and in the 1st season of Saravanan Meenatchi. In the second season of Saravanan Meenatchi, Kavin was initially given an antagonist role but, during the course of the show, his character of Vettaiyan went through a character arc and became the main lead. He won positive critical acclaim for his performance and won the Vijay Television Awards for Favourite Actor Male for 2015. After the end of season 2, Kavin opted not to act in any more television serials and stated his intentions of breaking into the Tamil film industry.

Kavin played a supporting role in S. R. Prabhakaran's Sathriyan (2017) and the lead role in Natpuna Ennanu Theriyuma (2019) during late 2016. Prior to these films, he appeared in small, insignificant roles in Karthik Subbaraj's Pizza (2012) and Ravikumar's Indru Netru Naalai (2015). Sathriyan, featuring Vikram Prabhu and Manjima Mohan, eventually opened to mixed reviews and Kavin's role as a doctor opposite Aishwarya Dutta in the film also was met with a mixed response. Natpuna Ennanu Theriyuma saw him associate with director Shiva Aravind, whom he became acquainted with during his stint with Star Vijay. They developed the script together. In the film, he played a man whose life changes after meeting the film's main character, played by Remya Nambeesan. The film went through several delays as the producer was keen to have a wide release across Tamil Nadu. The film was ultimately released in 2019 to mixed reviews.

Kavin became widely known because of his participation in the third season of Bigg Boss Tamil, after which he was cast as the lead actor in Lift, directed by Vineeth Varaprasad. He worked as an assistant director in Doctor (2021) and Beast (2022). His romantic web series titled Akash Vaani released on February 11, 2022.

Filmography
Films

Web series

Television

Host

 Vettaiyadu Vilaiyadu  For Star Vijay
 Vijay Television Awards 2015 & 2017 For Star Vijay
 Kings of Dance (season 1) For Star Vijay

Music Video

 Asku Maaro - Tamil  & Telugu For Sony Music South

Awards
Awards

References 

Living people
Male actors from Tiruchirappalli
Tamil male television actors
Tamil male actors
Indian television presenters
Male actors in Tamil cinema
21st-century Indian male actors
Bigg Boss (Tamil TV series) contestants
1990 births